The 1966 Missouri Tigers football team was an American football team that represented the University of Missouri in the Big Eight Conference (Big 8) during the 1966 NCAA University Division football season. The team compiled a 6–3–1 record (4–2–1 against Big 8 opponents), finished in a tie for third place in the Big 8, and outscored opponents by a combined total of 121 to 116. Dan Devine was the head coach for the ninth of 13 seasons. The team played its home games at Memorial Stadium in Columbia, Missouri.

The team's statistical leaders included Charlie Brown with 576 rushing yards, Gary Kombrink with 433 passing yards and 645 yards of total offense, Chuck Weber with 157 receiving yards, and Bill Bates with 27 points scored.

Schedule

Game summaries

Kansas

The 75th meeting between the two rivals was a defensive struggle that was finally broken in the third quarter. On third-and-seven from their own 46, Earl Denny caught a pass from Gary Kombrink in stride at the Kansas 38 and went in to score.

References

Missouri
Missouri Tigers football seasons
Missouri Tigers football